Topeka USD 501, also known as Topeka Public Schools, is a public unified school district headquartered in Topeka, Kansas, United States.  It is one of four school districts that serve the city of Topeka. Serving 13,430 students in the 2019-2020 school year, the district comprises 5 high schools, 6 middle schools, 15 elementary schools, and 7 other schools focused on serving other Pre-K-12 students. It has the highest enrollment of all school districts in Shawnee County.  Topeka Public Schools is widely known for its role in the landmark Brown v. Board of Education school desegregation case.

Administration
The school district is currently under the administration of Superintendent Tiffany Anderson.

Board of Education
The Board of Education is currently under the leadership of President Scott Mickelsen and Vice President John Williams.

Current schools
The school district operates the following schools:

High schools
Traditional high schools:
 Highland Park High School
 Topeka High School
 Topeka West High School

Non-traditional high schools:
 Capital City High School
 Hope Street Academy

Middle schools
 Chase Middle School
 Eisenhower Middle School
 French Middle School
 Jardine Middle School
 Landon Middle School
 Robinson Middle School

Elementary schools
 Highland Park Central Elementary School
 Jardine Elementary - opened Aug. 2017
 Lowman Hill Elementary School
 McCarter Elementary School
 McClure Elementary School
 McEachron Elementary School
 Meadows Elementary School
 Quincy Elementary School
 Randolph Elementary School
 Ross Elementary School
 Scott Dual Language Magnet School
 State Street Elementary School
 Stout Elementary School
 Whitson Elementary School
 Williams Science & Fine Arts Magnet School

Early Childhood Education Programs
 Kansas Preschool Program at Quinton Heights Education Center
 Parents As Teachers at Quinton Heights Education Center
 Early Childhood Special Education at Lundgren Education Center
 Sheldon Child Development Center - Head Start
 Pine Ridge Prep - State Pre-K Program
 Shaner Early Learning Academy

Closed Schools
 Avondale East Elementary School - closed after 2011-12 school year
 Avondale West Elementary School - students moved to Jardine Elementary Aug. 2017
 Bishop Elementary School - students moved to Jardine Elementary Aug. 2017
 Linn Elementary School - closed, due to budget cuts
 Lundgren Elementary School - Now the Social Work building
 Quinton Heights Elementary School - now Quinton Heights Preschool Program
 Shaner Elementary SchoolSchool - students moved to Jardine Elementary Aug. 2017

Other schools
 Adult Education Center at Washburn Tech
 Sheldon Head Start
 Hope Street Charter School
 Capital City School
Topeka Center for Advanced Learning and Careers

Current facilities
Several buildings and facilities are operated by Topeka Public Schools in support of learning, including:
 McKinley L. Burnett Administrative Center
 Chandler Field, adjacent to the former school building, used as a practice field
 Erickson Suite, a suite of 5 buildings on the former Kansas State Hospital grounds, hosting the USD 501 Campus Police, Hummer Sports Park management, and several program offices
 Hummer Sports Park, a six-sport facility available for outside use as well as by TPS athletic programs
 TPS Service Center
 Bishop Professional Development Center

Quick facts
 81.3% Graduation rate in 2020
 4,400 Students use district transportation every day
 14,500 Meals served at breakfast and lunch (72% Free or reduced lunch)
 2,471 District employees (19 district administrators, 67 building administrators, 1305 certified personnel, 1706 classified personnel)

See also
 Kansas State Department of Education
 Kansas State High School Activities Association
 List of high schools in Kansas
 List of unified school districts in Kansas

Topeka is served by four public school districts, including:
 Seaman USD 345 (serving North Topeka)
 Auburn–Washburn USD 437 (serving west and southwest Topeka)
 Shawnee Heights USD 450  (serving extreme east and southeast Topeka)
 Topeka USD 501 (serving inner-city Topeka)

References

External links 
 

School districts in Kansas
Education in Topeka, Kansas
Education in Shawnee County, Kansas